Paul Collier (born 30 July 1970 in Newport, Wales) is a Welsh snooker referee who has overseen three World Snooker Championship finals.

Career
Born in Newport, Wales, Collier began refereeing on the professional snooker circuit in 1992. In 2004 he took charge of the World Snooker Championship final between Ronnie O'Sullivan and Graeme Dott where he also became the youngest referee to take charge of a world championship final.  

He has been playing snooker since he was thirteen years old and became a qualified referee at fifteen. In December 1991, he became the youngest member of the Professional Snooker Referees Association. As well as Snooker, he has refereed both 9 Ball Pool and English Billiards World Championships. Whilst he took a break from the main tour he remained the sole referee for the Premier Snooker League taking charge of almost 300 matches over a thirteen-year spell Premier League Snooker.

Eighteen months after the 2004 final, in 2005, Collier quit the main tour, citing the lack of financial rewards in his profession. With only five ranking snooker events, he was no longer enjoying the tour. He was persuaded by Barry Hearn to re-join the main professional tour in 2011, with the additional opportunity to work as a Tournament Director and as one of only three assessors of professional referees. In June 2015 he refereed the final of the 2015 World Cup, played in Wuxi, China and won by China B.

In 2016 he refereed the final of the 2016 World Snooker Championship between Mark Selby and Ding Junhui.

In 2021 he took charge of his third Crucible final during the 2021 World Snooker Championship.

References

1970 births
Snooker referees and officials
Living people
Sportspeople from Newport, Wales
Welsh referees and umpires